EPQ may refer to:
 Economic production quantity
 Épargne Placements Québec, an administrative unit of the Quebec Ministry of Finance
 Extended Project Qualification, in the United Kingdom
 Eysenck Personality Questionnaire